The 13th Rome Grand Prix was a non-championship Formula One motor race held on 6 June 1954 on a street circuit in Castelfusano park, Rome, Lazio. The Grand Prix was won by Onofre Marimón in a Maserati 250F. This was his one and only Formula One win. Marimón also took pole position and fastest lap. Harry Schell finished second in a Maserati A6GCM and Sergio Mantovani was third in another Maserati 250F.

Classification

Race 

1Mercedes-Benz had contracted Fangio to drive for them once their car was ready. Until then he was allowed to drive for Maserati, but only in World Championship races.

References

Rome Grand Prix
Rome
1954 in Italian motorsport